Mununzi is a village in North Kivu in eastern Democratic Republic of the Congo. It is connected by road to Matango in the east.

External links
Maplandia World Gazetteer

Populated places in North Kivu